Johnny Ringo is an American Western television series starring Don Durant that aired on CBS from October 1, 1959, until June 30, 1960. It is loosely based on the life of the notorious gunfighter and outlaw Johnny Ringo, also known as John Peters Ringo or John B. Ringgold, who tangled with Wyatt Earp, Doc Holliday, and  Buckskin Franklyn Leslie.

Synopsis
This fictional account has Ringo putting aside his gunfighting ways to become the 27-year-old sheriff of fictitious Velardi in the Arizona Territory. Ringo has two deputies: William Charles, Jr., or Cully, played by Mark Goddard and Case Thomas, portrayed by Terence De Marney, who is also a storekeeper and formerly the town drunk. Case is killed in a robbery in the episode "Border Town", which aired on March 17, 1960. Case's daughter, Laura Thomas, played by Karen Sharpe, is Ringo's girlfriend in the series. Michael Hinn appeared in nine episodes as George Haig.

In the episode entitled "The Posse", Richard Devon plays Jessie Mead, a former Ringo friend who storms into town asking that he be jailed for protection from a pursuing posse, which Mead claims is really a lynch mob. Mead breaks a storefront glass to compel Ringo to arrest him. Actually, Mead has conspired with three others to rob the bank while the townspeople are diverted from their regular activities to pressure Ringo into turning Mead over to "the posse", the members of which are the other criminals. Ringo urges caution, but the irate townspeople want to take the matter into their own hands.

Cast

Main cast
 Don Durant as Johnny Ringo
 Mark Goddard as Cully
 Karen Sharpe as Laura Thomas
 Terence De Marney as Case Thomas

Guest cast
Charles Aidman, John Anderson, Raymond Bailey, Whit Bissell, Willis Bouchey, Lane Bradford, Dyan Cannon, John Carradine (as the lead in the episode "The Rain Man"), Conlan Carter, Lon Chaney, Jr., James Coburn, Tim Considine, Ben Cooper, Robert Culp (as Clay Horne in the series finale, "Cave-In")

Royal Dano (as Lucas Frome in "Black Harvest"), Carter DeHaven and his daughter Gloria DeHaven, Don Dubbins, Buddy Ebsen, Gene Evans, Jay C. Flippen, Mona Freeman, Dabbs Greer, Alan Hale, Jr., Connie Hines, Rodolfo Hoyos Jr., Arch Johnson, L. Q. Jones, Brett King, Wright King, John Larch, Martin Landau, Mort Mills, Gerald Mohr, Vic Morrow, Ed Nelson, Warren Oates, Debra Paget (as Agnes St. John, an author who witnesses a brutal stagecoach robbery in "East Is East")

William Phipps, John M. Pickard, Burt Reynolds (as Tad Stuart in "The Stranger"), Paul Richards, Wayne Rogers, Richard Rust, Walter Sande, William Schallert, Robert F. Simon, Olan Soule, Arthur Space, Harry Dean Stanton, Stella Stevens, Karl Swenson, Harry Townes, Lurene Tuttle, and Peter Whitney.

Production

Development
The program was an early creation of Aaron Spelling for Four Star Television. Spelling created Johnny Ringo at the specific request of Dick Powell as a role for Durant. It was filmed at CBS Studio Center. The pilot episode was shot as part of Dick Powell's Zane Grey Theater, titled "Man Alone" and featured Thomas Mitchell as Case Thomas. A second pilot was shot with Terence de Marney in the role.

Gimmick guns genre
Johnny Ringo appeared at a time in the history of the television Western when creators strove to make characters interesting by equipping them with "gimmick guns", the three most famous having been Josh Randall's "mare's laig" used by Steve McQueen in CBS's Wanted: Dead or Alive, Lucas McCain's trick rifle from ABC's The Rifleman, and the shotgun with the upper and lower barrel, intended to enforce accuracy both up close and at a distance, used by Scott Brady in Shotgun Slade.

The gimmick gun introduced in the second pilot was a custom-built revolver called the LeMat, based on its historically authentic counterpart. The LeMat featured an auxiliary shotgun barrel under its primary barrel. Many episodes found Ringo getting into scrapes where that final round in the shotgun barrel was the deciding factor. Aesthetically, Ringo's LeMat most resembles the historical percussion model LeMat but features a top break cartridge-fed design.

Syndication as The Westerners
For syndicated reruns, the show was combined with three other Western series from the same company, Black Saddle starring Peter Breck, Law of the Plainsman starring Michael Ansara, and Sam Peckinpah's critically acclaimed creation, The Westerner starring Brian Keith, under the umbrella title The Westerners, with additional hosting segments featuring Keenan Wynn

Episodes

Reception
Johnny Ringo scored good ratings in its Thursday competition with ABC's The Real McCoys with Walter Brennan, sometimes reaching into the Top Twenty. The program was dropped at the request of a sponsor, Johnson Wax Company, which wanted a sitcom, rather than a Western. At the time there were thirty Western series on the networks. After the cancellation of Johnny Ringo, Mark Goddard went on to co-star as Det. Sgt. Chris Ballard in still another Four Star Productions TV series , The Detectives Starring Robert Taylor on ABC, replacing Lee Farr. He later went on to the CBS-TV series, Lost in Space.

References

 McNeil, Alex. Total Television  (1996). New York: Penguin Books 
 Brooks, Tim and Marsh, Earle, The Complete Directory to Prime Time Network and Cable TV Shows (1999). New York: Ballantine Books

External links
 
 Golden Wheel Saloon -- showcasing Mark Goddard/Johnny Ringo. 
Johnny Ringo Fan/Tribute site

1950s Western (genre) television series
CBS original programming
1959 American television series debuts
1960 American television series endings
Television series by Spelling Television
Television series by 20th Century Fox Television
Television series by Four Star Television
Black-and-white American television shows
English-language television shows
Television shows set in Arizona
Cultural depictions of Johnny Ringo
Television series created by Aaron Spelling
Western (genre) television series featuring gimmick weapons
1960s Western (genre) television series